Latvians are a Baltic ethnic group and nation native to Latvia and the immediate geographical region, the Baltics. They are occasionally also referred to as Letts, especially in older bibliography. Latvians share a common Latvian language, culture and history.

History
A Balto-Finnic-speaking tribe known as the Livs settled among the Latvians and modulated the name to "Latvis", meaning "forest-clearers", which is how medieval German, Teutonic settlers also referred to these peoples. The Germanic settlers referred to the natives as "Letts" and the nation to "Lettland", naming their colony Livonia or Livland.

The Latin form, Livonia, gradually referred to the whole territory of modern-day Latvia as well as southern Estonia, which had fallen under a minimal Germanic influence. Latvians and Lithuanians are the only surviving members of the Baltic branch of the Indo-European family.

Genetics
Paternal haplogroups R1a and N1a1-Tat are the two most frequent, reaching 39.9% each among ethnic Latvians. R1a has originated in Eastern Europe and is associated with spread of Indo-European languages. R1a of Latvians is predominantly M558 and compared to other populations also has the highest concentration of M558 among R1a. N1a1-Tat mutation originated in East Asia and had spread through the Urals into Europe where it is currently most common among Finnic, Baltic and Eastern-Slavic peoples. Latvians and Lithuanians have a predominance of the L550 branch of N1a1-Tat.

N1c1a was present in 41.5%, R1a1a-M558 in 35.2% and I1 (M253) in 6.3% of the samples analyzed. In lower levels 2.5% of I2b (M223) and 0.6% I2a (P37.2) was found as well.

Culture

Influences

Latvians share a common language and have a unique culture with traditions, holidays, customs and arts. The culture and religious traditions have been somewhat influenced by Germanic, Scandinavian, and Russian traditions. Latvians have an ancient culture that has been archaeologically dated back to 3000 BC. Latvians maintained a considerable connection and trade with their neighbors. The first indications of human inhabitants on the lands of modern Latvia date archaeologically to  9000 BC, suggesting that the first settlers were hunters that stayed almost immediately following the end of the last ice age. Colonizers from the south arrived quickly, driving many of the hunters northward as polar ice caps melted further, or east, into modern-day Russia, Belarus, and Ukraine. The Roman author Tacitus remarked upon the "Aestii" peoples, thought to be inhabitants of the modern Baltic lands, suggesting that they were abound with formidable, yet peaceful and hospitable people. The Latvian peoples remained relatively undisturbed until Papal intervention via the Germanic, Teutonic Order colonized Kurzeme (Courland in English, Kurland in German), beginning in the first half of the 13th century. Papal decrees ordered the Teutonic Order to spread the "Word of the Lord" and the Gospel of Christianity throughout "uncivilized", "Pagan lands". Though these attempts to Christianize the population failed, and the Teutonic Order eventually redeployed southward, to the region of what was once known as East Prussia.

South-Eastern Latvia (Latgale), due to having a relatively large ethnic Russian population, has maintained a large Russian influence.

Religion

Paganism was the main religion before territory of Latvia was invaded by Christian Teutonic Order (see: Latvian mythology). Latvians still celebrate traditional feasts (Jāņi). Dievturība is a neopagan movement which claims to be a modern revival of the ethnic religion of the Latvians before Christianization in the 13th century.

Most of the Christian Latvians belong to the Evangelical Lutheran Church, but in Latgale and Alsunga Municipality the Roman Catholic Church is predominant, a small minority of Latvians belong to the Latvian Orthodox Church and other religious congregations. In the late 18th century, a small but vibrant Herrnhutist movement played a significant part in the development of Latvian literary culture before it was absorbed into the mainstream Lutheran denomination.

Language
Latvians' ancestral language, Latvian, has been recorded since at least the 16th century. It developed into a distinct language by the 9th century. It is part of a distinct linguistic branch of Indo-European languages: the Baltic languages.

Another notable language of Latvia is the nearly extinct Livonian language, a member of the Baltic-Finnic sub-branch of the Uralic language family, which enjoys protection by law. The Latgalian language (a dialect of Latvian) is also protected by Latvian law as a historical variation of the Latvian language.

See also

 List of Latvians
 Demographics of Latvia
 Latvian Americans
 Latvian Australians
 Latvian Canadians
 Baltic people in the United Kingdom
 Latvian Swedes
 Latvian mythology

References

External links
 Latvia. Lettish Life in Legendary & Modern Times by Florence Farmborough. In: Peoples of All Nations: Their Life Today and Story of Their Past. Vol 5 – pp. 3267-3296 (first published in 1920)
 

Baltic peoples
Ethnic groups in Latvia